Bambi is a 1942 American animated drama film directed by David Hand (supervising a team of sequence directors), produced by Walt Disney and based on the 1923 book Bambi, a Life in the Woods by Austrian author and hunter Felix Salten. The film was released by RKO Radio Pictures on August 13, 1942, and is the fifth Disney animated feature film.

The main characters are Bambi, a white-tailed deer; his parents (the Great Prince of the forest and his unnamed mother); his friends Thumper (a pink-nosed rabbit); and Flower (a skunk); and his childhood friend and future mate, Faline. In the original book, Bambi was a roe deer, a species native to Europe; but Disney decided to base the character on a mule deer from Arrowhead, California. Illustrator Maurice "Jake" Day convinced Disney that the mule deer had large "mule-like" ears and were more common to western North America; but that the white-tail deer was more recognized throughout America.

The film received three Academy Award nominations: Best Sound (Sam Slyfield), Best Song (for "Love Is a Song" sung by Donald Novis) and Original Music Score.

In June 2008, the American Film Institute presented a list of its "10 Top 10"—the best ten films in each of ten classic American film genres—after polling over 1,500 people from the creative community. Bambi placed third in animation. In December 2011, the film was added to the National Film Registry of the Library of Congress as being "culturally, historically and aesthetically significant".

In January 2020, it was announced that a photorealistic computer-animated remake was in development.

Plot

A doe gives birth to a fawn named Bambi, who will one day take over the position of Great Prince of the Forest, a title currently held by Bambi's father, who guards the woodland creatures against the dangers of hunters. The fawn is quickly befriended by an eager, energetic rabbit named Thumper, who helps to teach him to walk and speak. Bambi grows up very attached to his mother, with whom he spends most of his time. He soon makes other friends, including a young skunk he mistakenly calls "Flower" (who is so flattered, he keeps the name) and a female fawn named Faline. Curious and inquisitive, Bambi frequently asks about the world around him and is cautioned about the dangers of life as a forest creature by his loving mother. One day out in a meadow, Bambi briefly sees The Great Prince but does not realize that he is his father. As the Great Prince wanders uphill, he discovers the human hunter, named "Man" by all the animals, is coming and rushes down to the meadow to get everyone to safety. Bambi is briefly separated from his mother during that time but is escorted to her by the Great Prince as the three of them make it back in the forest just as Man fires his gun.

During Bambi's first winter, he and Thumper play in the snow while Flower hibernates. One day his mother takes him along to find food when Man shows up again. As they escape, his mother is shot and killed by the hunter, leaving the little fawn mournful and alone. Taking pity on his abandoned son, the Great Prince leads Bambi home as he reveals to him that he is his father. Next year, Bambi has matured into a young stag, and his childhood friends have also entered young adulthood. They are warned of "twitterpation" by Friend Owl and that they will eventually fall in love, although the trio views the concept of romance with scorn. However, Thumper and Flower soon encounter their beautiful romantic counterparts and abandon their former thoughts on love. Bambi himself encounters Faline as a beautiful doe. However, their courtship is quickly interrupted and challenged by a belligerent older stag named Ronno, who attempts to force Faline away from Bambi. Bambi successfully manages to defeat Ronno in battle and earn the rights to the doe's affections.

Bambi is awakened afterward by the smell of smoke; he follows it and discovers it leads to a hunter camp. His father warns Bambi that Man has returned with more hunters. Although Bambi is separated from Faline in the turmoil and searches for her along the way, the two flee to safety. He soon finds her cornered by Man's vicious hunting dogs, which he manages to ward off. Bambi escapes them and is shot by Man, but survives. Meanwhile, at the "Man's" camp, their campfire suddenly spreads into the forest, resulting in a wildfire from which the forest residents flee in fear. Bambi, his father, Faline, and the forest animals manage to reach shelter on a riverbank. The following spring, Faline gives birth to twins under Bambi's watchful eye as the new Great Prince of the Forest.

Cast

The cast includes the following voice actors.
 Bambi, the film's title character and protagonist:
 Bobby Stewart as Baby Bambi
 Donnie Dunagan as Young Bambi
 Hardie Albright as Adolescent Bambi
 John Sutherland as Young Adult Bambi
 Thumper, a rabbit friend of Bambi's:
 Peter Behn as Young Thumper
 Tim Davis as Adolescent Thumper
 Sam Edwards as Young Adult Thumper
 Paula Winslowe as Bambi's Mother and the Pheasant
 Flower, a striped skunk and another friend of Bambi's:
 Stan Alexander as Young Flower
 Tim Davis as Adolescent Flower
 Sterling Holloway as Young Adult Flower
 Will Wright as Friend Owl
 Faline, a female deer whom Bambi eventually falls in love with:
Cammie King as Young Faline
 Ann Gillis as Young Adult Faline
 Fred Shields as Great Prince of the Forest
 Margaret Lee as Mrs. Rabbit
 Mary Lansing as Aunt Ena and Mrs. Possum
 Perce Pearce as Mr. Mole
 Thelma Boardman as Girl Bunny, Quail Mother, Female Pheasant

Notes
Sources differ on whether Sutherland actually voiced Young Adult Bambi.

Production

Development
In 1933, Sidney Franklin, a producer and director at Metro-Goldwyn-Mayer, purchased the film rights to Felix Salten's novel Bambi, a Life in the Woods, intending to adapt it as a live-action film. After years of experimentation, he eventually decided that it would be too difficult to make such a film and he sold the film rights to Walt Disney in April 1937. Disney began work on crafting an animated adaptation immediately, intending it to be the company's second feature-length animated film and their first to be based on a specific, recent work. However, the original novel was written for an adult audience, and was considered too "grim" and "somber" for a regular light-hearted Disney film. The artists also discovered that it would be challenging to animate deer realistically. These difficulties resulted in Disney putting production on hold while the studio worked on several other projects. In 1938, Disney assigned Perce Pearce and Carl Fallberg to work on the film's storyboards, but attention was soon drawn away as the studio began working on Fantasia. Finally, on August 17, 1939, production on Bambi began in earnest, but progressed slowly owing to changes in the studio personnel, location, and methodology of handling animation at the time.

Writing
There were many interpretations of the story. As writer and animator Mel Shaw recalled: 

Originally the film was intended to have six individual bunny characters, similar to the dwarfs in Snow White. However Perce Pearce suggested that they could instead have five generic rabbits and one rabbit with a different color than the rest, with one tooth, would have a very distinct personality. This character later became known as Thumper.

There originally was a brief shot in the scene where Bambi's mother dies after jumping over a log and getting shot by a man. Larry Morey, however, felt the scene was too dramatic, and that it was emotional enough to justify having her death occur off screen. Walt Disney was also eager to show the man burned to death by his fire that he inadvertently started, but this was discarded when it was decided not to show the man at all. There was also a scene involving two autumn leaves conversing like an old married couple before parting ways and falling to the ground, but Disney found that talking flora did not work in the context of the film, and instead a visual metaphor of two realistic leaves falling to the ground was used instead. Disney and his story team also developed the characters consisting of a squirrel and a chipmunk that were to be a comic duo reminiscent of Laurel and Hardy. However, after years of experimentation, Walt felt that the story should focus on the three principal characters: Bambi, Thumper and Flower. The squirrel and chipmunk make only brief appearances in the final film.

The writing was completed in July 1940, by which time the film's budget had increased to $858,000.

Animation
Although the animators had animated deer in Snow White, they were animated, in the words of Eric Larson, "like big flour sacks". Disney wanted the animals in Bambi to be more realistic and expressive than those in Snow White. He had Rico LeBrun, a painter of animals, come and lecture to the animators on the structure and movement of animals. The animators visited the Los Angeles Zoo and Disney set up a small zoo at the studio with animals such as rabbits, ducks, owls, and skunks, and a pair of fawns named Bambi and Faline so that the artists could see first-hand the movement of these animals. LeBrun's sketches depicted realistic animals, but as characters they lacked personality. Marc Davis created the final design of Bambi by incorporating LeBrun's realistic study of deer anatomy but exaggerating the character's face by making his proportions baby-like (short snout, big eyes, etc.). Although there were no humans in Bambi, live-action footage of humans was used for one scene: actress Jane Randolph and Ice Capades star Donna Atwood acted as live-action references for the scene where Bambi and Thumper are on the icy pond. The animators learned a lot about animals during the film's production, giving them a broader spectrum of animation styles to use in future projects.

The backgrounds for the film were inspired by the Eastern American woodlands. One of the earliest and best-known artists for the Disney studio, Maurice "Jake" Day, spent several weeks in the Vermont and Maine forests, sketching and photographing deer, fawns, and the surrounding wilderness areas. However his first sketches were too "busy" as the eye did not know where to focus. Tyrus Wong, a Chinese animator, showed Day some of his impressionistic paintings of a forest. Day liked the paintings and appointed him art director of the film. Wong's backgrounds were revolutionary since they had more detail around the center and less around the edges, thus leading a viewer's eye to the characters.

Due to World War II, which began in Europe in 1939, Pinocchio and Fantasia failed at the box office. Facing financial difficulty, Disney was forced to cut 12 minutes from the film before final animation to save production costs.

Songs

Release
Bambi was released in theaters in 1942, during World War II, and was Disney's 5th full-length animated film. The film was re-released to theatres in the United States in 1947, 1957, 1966, 1975, 1982 and 1988. It was then made available in North America on home video in 1989 and in the UK in 1994. Even in home video, it has seen multiple releases, including three VHS releases — in 1989 (Classics Version), 1997 (Masterpiece Collection Version), and 2005 (Platinum Edition version), one Betamax release in 1989 (Classics version), two Laserdisc releases in 1989 (Classics version) and 1997 (Masterpiece Collection version) — and most recently a digitally-remastered and restored Platinum Edition DVD. The Platinum Edition DVD went on moratorium on January 31, 2007.

Bambi was released as a Diamond Edition on March 1, 2011, consisting of a Blu-ray and DVD combo pack. This release included multiple bonus features not previously included in Bambi home releases: a documentary entitled Inside Walt's Story Meetings – Enhanced Edition, two deleted scenes, a deleted song, an image gallery, and a game entitled Disney's Big Book of Knowledge: Bambi Edition. This release also marked the first use of "Disney Second Screen", a feature which is accessed via a computer or iPad app download that syncs with the Blu-ray disc, allowing the viewer to follow along by interacting with animated flip-books, galleries and trivia while watching the movie. A UK version of Diamond Edition was released on February 7, 2011.

In honor of the film's 75th anniversary, Bambi was released as part of the Walt Disney Signature Collection on May 23, 2017 (digital) and June 6, 2017 (Blu-ray/DVD/digital combo pack).

Localization 
On the initiative of Stephen Greymoming, professor of Native American studies and anthropology at the University of Montana, an Arapaho-language dubbing of the movie was produced in 1994, in collaboration with the Northern Plains Educational Foundation. The final product was, however, only a partial dubbing, as the spoken parts were dubbed in Arapaho, but all the songs were left in English. The dubbed version of the movie premiered on November 3 the same year, and Disney later provided the Arapaho Nation with 2000 VHS tapes of the movie. The dubbing was never issued again in any other forms, until it was uploaded on the streaming platform Disney+ in October 2022. Bambi was the first of three Disney movies to receive a dubbing in a Native American language. The next such instance had to wait until 2016, when Pixar's Finding Nemo received a dubbing in Navajo, and then Disney's Moana in Hawaiian two years later. While the first was also made available on Disney+, the latter was only distributed for free in schools in Hawaii, and never received any home media release form.

Reception

Critical reaction
At the time of the film's release, Bambi received mixed reviews from the critics, mainly because of the lack of fantasy elements in the film and objection towards a dramatic story of animals and their struggle to survive in the woods and avoid the threat of humans. The New York Times claimed that "In the search for perfection, Mr. Disney has come perilously close to tossing away his whole world of cartoon fantasy." Manny Farber of The New Republic deemed the film "unpleasant". He also stated that "In an attempt to ape the trumped-up realism of flesh and blood movies, he has given up fantasy, which was pretty much the magic element." Even Disney's daughter Diane complained, saying that Bambi's mother did not need to die. When Walt claimed that he was only following the book, Diane protested, saying that he had taken other liberties before and that Walt Disney could do whatever he wanted.

Today, however, Bambi is viewed as one of the greatest animated films ever made. The website consensus reads: "Elegantly animated and deeply touching, Bambi is an enduring, endearing, and moving Disney classic." Critics Mick Martin and Marsha Porter call the film "the crowning achievement of Walt Disney's animation studio". English film historian Leslie Halliwell wrote that Bambi was "one of Disney's most memorable and brilliant achievements with a great comic character in Thumper and a climactic forest fire sequence that is genuinely thrilling". He concluded that it was  "a triumph of the animator's arts."

Box office
The film was released during World War II and did not perform as well as hoped. Roy O. Disney sent a telegram to his brother Walt after the New York opening of the film that read: "Fell short of our holdover figure by $4,000. Just came from Music Hall. Unable to make any deal to stay third week ... Night business is our problem." The film earned RKO theatrical rentals of $1,270,000 in the United States and Canada in its initial release.

Disney lacked access to much of the European market during the war, however, the film earned rentals of $1,685,000 internationally for an initial worldwide total of $2,955,000, Disney's third highest, behind Snow White and the Seven Dwarfs (1937) with $7.8 million and Pinocchio (1940) with $3.2 million.

In its first reissue in the United States in 1947, the film earned additional domestic rentals of $900,000 but did much better 10 years later, more than doubling the domestic rental total with a further $2.5 million taking its total domestic rental earnings to $4.7 million.

The film earned $14 million in domestic rentals from its reissues in 1966 and 1975 giving it a total domestic rental of $18,735,000, which equates to a gross of around $40 million. In 1982, it grossed another $23 million in the United States and Canada and in 1988, a further $39 million, taking its total in the United States and Canada to $102 million, making it (at the time) the second highest-grossing animated movie of all-time after Snow White and the Seven Dwarfs. With grosses from international reissues, the film has a worldwide gross of $267 million.

Awards and nominations

In June 2008, the American Film Institute revealed its "10 Top 10" – the best ten films in ten classic American film genres – after polling over 1,500 people from the creative community. Bambi was acknowledged as the third best film in the animation genre. It is also listed in the Top 25 Horror Movies of All Time by Time magazine. Bambi, Time states, "has a primal shock that still haunts oldsters who saw it 40, 50, 65 years ago."

American Film Institute
 AFI's 100 Years... 100 Movies – Nominated
 AFI's 100 Years... 100 Heroes and Villains:
 Man – No. 20 Villain
 AFI's 100 Years of Film Scores – Nominated
 AFI's 100 Years... 100 Movies (10th Anniversary Edition) – Nominated
 AFI's 10 Top 10 – No. 3 Animated film

Home media
Prior to Bambis initial release on home video on September 28, 1989, initial orders placed in the United States and Canada up to the end of August totaled 9.8 million units, the second largest number of orders for a video at the time, behind E.T. the Extra-Terrestrial, with a wholesale value of $167 million.

Comic adaptation
The Silly Symphony Sunday comic strip ran a three-month-long adaptation of Bambi from July 19 to October 4, 1942.

Legacy
The off-screen villain "Man" has been placed No. 20 on AFI's List of Heroes and Villains.

Some critics have cited parallels between Frank Churchill's theme music for "Man" (which consisted of three simple notes) and John Williams's theme music in Jaws (which consists of two notes).

Paul McCartney has credited the shooting death of Bambi's mother for his initial interest in animal rights.

Soon after the film's release, Walt Disney allowed his characters to appear in fire prevention public service campaigns. However, Bambi was only loaned to the government for a year, so a new symbol was needed, leading to the creation of Smokey Bear. Bambi and his mother also make a cameo appearance in the satirical 1955 Donald Duck short No Hunting: drinking from a forest stream, the deer are startled by a sudden trickle of beer cans and other debris, and Bambi's mother tells him, "Man is in the forest. Let's dig out."

In 2006, the Ad Council, in partnership with the United States Forest Service, started a series of Public Service Announcements that feature footage from Bambi and Bambi II for wildfire prevention. During the ads, as the Bambi footage is shown, the screen will momentarily fade into black with the text "Don't let our forests...become once upon a time", and usually (but not always) ending the ads with Bambi's line "Mother, what we gonna do today?" followed by Smokey Bear saying "Only you can prevent wildfires" as the Smokey logo is shown on the screen. Bambi had previously been the Forest Service's advertising icon beginning in 1942, but was only allowed by Disney to use the character for a year.

In December 2011, Bambi was among the films selected for preservation in the Library of Congress' National Film Registry. In its induction, the Registry said that the film was one of Walt Disney's favorites and that it has been "recognized for its eloquent message of nature conservation."

Characters of the film appear in several other Disney media, such as guest appearances in the animated television series House of Mouse, Bambi being a character to summon in the video game Kingdom Hearts, and Bambi, Thumper and Flower being playable characters in Disney Magic Kingdoms.

On December 17, 2018, a prison sentence passed against a man, in what is considered the biggest deer poaching case in Missouri history, contained the stipulation that the prisoner must view the film at least once each month during his one-year prison sentence.

Sequel

Set in the middle of Bambi, Bambi II shows the Great Prince of the Forest struggling to raise the motherless Bambi, and Bambi's doubts about his father's love. The film was released direct-to-video on February 7, 2006. While the film was a direct-to-video release in the United States and other countries, including Canada, China, Hong Kong, Japan and Taiwan, it was a theatrical release in some countries, including Australia, Austria, Brazil, Dominican Republic, France, Mexico, the United Kingdom and some other European countries.

Computer-animated remake
On January 28, 2020, it was announced that a photorealistic CGI feature-length remake is in development with a script co-written by Geneva Robertson-Dworet and Lindsey Beer. Paul Weitz, Chris Weitz, and Andrew Miano will produce the film; a joint-venture production between Walt Disney Pictures, Depth of Field Studios, and Known Universe Productions. The Walt Disney Company described the film as a "companion piece" to The Jungle Book (2016) and The Lion King (2019), as the three films feature wildlife that requires extensive CGI and special effects.

Copyright
The copyrights for Bambi, a Life in the Woods were inherited by Anna Wyler, Salten's daughter, who renewed them in 1954. After her death, Wyler's husband sold the rights to Twin Books, a publishing company which subsequently filed a lawsuit against Disney, claiming Disney owed it money for the continued licensing for the use of the book. Disney countered by claiming that Salten had published the story in 1923 without a copyright notice, thus it immediately entered into the public domain. Disney also argued that if the claimed 1923 publication date was accurate, then the copyright renewal filed in 1954 had been registered after the deadline and was thus invalid. The courts initially upheld Disney's view; however, in 1996, the Ninth Circuit Court reversed the decision on appeal in Twin Books Corp. v. Walt Disney Co., 83 F.3d 1162 (1996).

References

Further reading

External links

 
 Bambi, an essay by John Wills at National Film Registry
 
 
Bambi at Don Markstein's Toonopedia. Archived from the original on February 22, 2018.
 

1942 animated films
1942 films
1940s American animated films
1940s fantasy films
1940s English-language films
American children's animated fantasy films
American coming-of-age films
Animated coming-of-age films
Animated films about animals
Animated films about friendship
Animated films based on novels
Bambi
Films about deer and moose
Films adapted into comics
Films directed by Bill Roberts
Films directed by David Hand
Films directed by James Algar
Films directed by Samuel Armstrong
Films directed by Graham Heid
Films directed by Paul Satterfield
Films directed by Norman Wright
Films produced by Walt Disney
Films about hunters
Films scored by Frank Churchill
Films set in forests
Films set in North America
United States National Film Registry films
Walt Disney Animation Studios films
Walt Disney Pictures animated films
1940s children's animated films
Films based on Austrian novels
Films based on works by Felix Salten
Drama animation
Animated drama films
Films about mother–son relationships
White-tailed deer